Sudeepa Singh (born 23 August) is an Indian actress, model and television presenter. She has done more than 600 advertisements for India, Pakistan and the United Arab Emirates. She is known for her Bollywood film Action Replayy with Aditya Roy Kapoor and the Punjabi film Ek Noor, for which she won the Critics' Best Actress Award" in 2011 at the PTC Punjabi Film Awards. She is also have a role in Baal veer as Rani pari.

.

Television and films
Ardhangini (2007 TV series)
 Baal Veer
 Nagarjun Ek Yoddha
 Action Replayy Hindi Film
 Dil Hi Toh Hai
 Tv,Biwi Aur main
 Rudra Ke Rakshak
 Kabaddi Once Again
 Ek Noor Punjabi Film

Television advertisement
Lifebuoy (soap) Brand

References

External links
 

Indian actresses
Indian female models
Living people
Year of birth missing (living people)
Place of birth missing (living people)